Fox Tower is a tower built by John Metcalf Carleton, an industrial entrepreneur, as a folly in 1775 on his large estate next to Brough, a village in Cumbria, England. The folly can be seen from Brough Castle and the road A66 road looking towards the fells. The tower is now closed to the public.

References 

Towers in Cumbria
Folly towers in England
Eden District
Towers completed in 1775